Thomas Lee Robinson Parker (born 1963) is a United States district judge of the United States District Court for the Western District of Tennessee.

Education and career

Parker received a Bachelor of Science degree in 1985 from the University of South Carolina. He received a Juris Doctor in 1989 from Vanderbilt University School of Law. Parker began his legal career as an associate at Waring Cox Lawyers in Memphis, Tennessee. He then served as an Assistant United States Attorney in the Western District of Tennessee for nine years. Before becoming a federal judge, he was a shareholder in the Memphis office of Baker, Donelson, Bearman, Caldwell & Berkowitz, P.C., where he represented clients in civil litigation and criminal matters. Additionally, he previously served as President of the Memphis Bar Association and is a fellow in the American College of Trial Lawyers.

Federal judicial service

On July 13, 2017, President Donald Trump nominated Parker to serve as a United States District Judge of the United States District Court for the Western District of Tennessee, to the seat vacated by Judge Samuel H. Mays Jr., who assumed senior status on July 1, 2015. A hearing on his nomination before the Senate Judiciary Committee was held on September 6, 2017. On October 5, 2017, his nomination was reported out of committee by a voice vote. On January 9, 2018, the United States Senate invoked cloture on his nomination by a 96–1 vote. On January 10, 2018, his nomination was confirmed by a 98–0 vote. He received his commission on January 30, 2018. He was sworn into office on February 2, 2018.

References

External links
 
 

1963 births
Living people
20th-century American lawyers
21st-century American lawyers
21st-century American judges
Assistant United States Attorneys
Judges of the United States District Court for the Western District of Tennessee
People from Memphis, Tennessee
Tennessee lawyers
United States district court judges appointed by Donald Trump
University of South Carolina alumni
Vanderbilt University Law School alumni